The Mall Lifestore Nakhon Ratchasima or commonly known as The Mall Korat, opened in 2000, is a shopping mall in Nakhon Ratchasima Province, Thailand. It is the biggest shopping center in northeastern Thailand.

Anchors 
 The Mall Department Store
 Gourmet Market (The First Branch in Northeast)
 Korat Cineplex 10 Cinemas (Old EGV Korat Move to EGV Lotus's Phimai)
 Be Trend
 Power Mall
 Sport Mall
 Beauty Hall
 SB Design Square
 Fitness First
 The Mall Food Hall
 MCC Hall Korat

See also
 List of shopping malls in Thailand

References

Shopping malls in Thailand
The Mall Group
Buildings and structures in Nakhon Ratchasima
Badminton venues
Badminton in Thailand
Shopping malls established in 2000
Tourist attractions in Nakhon Ratchasima province
2000 establishments in Thailand